The Shchusev Museum of Architecture is a national museum of Russian Architecture located in Moscow the capital of Russia and also a research centre to study and promote the architectural and urban heritage. The museum was founded in 1934 and is located on the Vozdvizhenka Street. The collections include more than 800000 items. The museum is named after Russian and Soviet architect Alexey Shchusev.

History

The original museum of the Academy of Architecture, established in 1934 was located in the secularized Donskoy Monastery. The sprawling fortified monastery housed hundreds of fragments of art salvaged from the demolished buildings. The museum was dedicated, at least officially, to worldwide architecture of all periods and styles, although most tangible exhibits were Russian.

In the summer of 1945 Alexey Shchusev began campaigning for the establishment of a museum of Russian national architecture. The new museum was established in 1946, with Shchusev as its first director. The Baldin Collection of German art was secretly deposited in the museum, with Shchusev's consent, in 1948. However, the main purpose of the museum, as envisaged by Shchusev himself, was the recording and archiving of Russian heritage that was destroyed or damaged during the war. For the first ten years, it operated primarily as a research and archive institution; the first permanent public exhibition opened in 1957.

In 1964, after Nikita Khrushchev had disbanded the Academy of Architecture, the two museums were merged into the Shchusev Museum of Architecture. The Donskoy Monastery and the Talyzin House exhibited pre-revolutionary Russian and post-revolutionary Soviet exhibits, respectively. In 1991 the government expelled the museum from the monastery. Some exhibits were evacuated to the Talyzin House, others remained within the monastery walls. The Talyzin House, meanwhile, was falling apart after decades of poor maintenance and vibration from subway trains, and had to be closed for a lengthy restoration.

In the 21st century, the museum operates three main exhibition sites in Vozdvizhenka Street: the reconstructed Talyzin House, the nearby "Ruin" building, and the 17th century building of the former . The Melnikov House became part of the museum in 2018.

Sources

References

External links 

 Shchusev State Museum of Architecture

Museums in Moscow
National museums
Architecture museums
Architecture in Russia
Art museums established in 1934
1934 establishments in Russia